Kraoutar Krikou (born 2 March 1982) is the Algerian Minister of National Solidarity, Family and Women's Affairs. She was appointed as minister on 9 September 2022.

Education 
Krikou holds a Master in Business Law.

References 

1982 births
21st-century Algerian politicians
Algerian politicians
Government ministers of Algeria
Living people

Women government ministers of Algeria